Russell Frederick Phillips (September 17, 1888 in Rat Portage, Ontario – August 22, 1949 in Vancouver, British Columbia) was a Canadian ice hockey player. Russell was a member of the Stanley Cup 1907 champion Kenora Thistles. Russell was the younger brother of the Hockey Hall of Fame member Tommy Phillips.

Career
He played four regular season games as a forward for the Thistles in 1906–07. However in January 1907, along with legendary defenseman "Bad" Joe Hall, Kenora defeated the Montreal Wanderers in a Stanley Cup Challenge game, while Phillips sat on sidelines as a spare. He was still included on the Stanley Cup winning picture, and the award gold plate cup. In 1907–08 he played one game for the Kenora Thistles. Later he played for the New Ontario Hockey League (NOHL)'s Fort William Forts.

External links
 Kenora Thistles tribute website references Russell Phillips
  Picture of Stanley Cup Champion team 1907, includes Russell Phillips

1888 births
1949 deaths
Canadian ice hockey forwards
Ice hockey people from Ontario
Kenora Thistles players
Sportspeople from Kenora
Stanley Cup champions